The Philippine Stock Exchange Tower is an office skyscraper in One Bonifacio High Street, Bonifacio Global City in Taguig. The building has 30 floors above ground level. It serves as the new headquarters and unified trading floor of the Philippine Stock Exchange.

It was designed by US-based Handel Architects, in collaboration with Leandro V Locsin Partners and GF & Partners Architects. The building is characterized as an all-glass, grade A level building. It is occupied by the stock brokers and trading managers of the PSE.

History
The construction of the PSE Tower was originally planned in 2004, but hurdles such as location, naming rights, and the building's design put this plan on hold until 2008, when the building became part of the One Bonifacio High Street Project, a mixed-use development in BGC, costing ₱30 billion overall.

Groundbreaking was held in 2012, and it was topped off in 2017, before being opened in early 2018.

Facilities

Trading Floor
Smaller than the previous trading floors, as trades became more computerized, the PSE Tower has a unified trading floor from both traders of the Ayala Tower One in the Makati Central Business District and the Philippine Stock Exchange Centre in Ortigas Center, Pasig.

Museum
There is a planned museum to look back at the history of the Philippine Stock Exchange.

Retail
The tower also houses retail shops in the mezzanine and ground floors,  and is directly connected to the One Bonifacio High Street Mall

References

Buildings and structures in Quezon City
Buildings and structures completed in 2017